The Diocese of Moesia was a diocese of the later Roman Empire, in the area of modern western Bulgaria, central Serbia, Montenegro, Albania, North Macedonia, and Greece.

History

The Diocese of Moesia was one of the twelve dioceses in which Diocletian (284–305) divided the Roman Empire during his administrative reforms. It encompassed most of the ancient Greek and Illyrian lands, stretching from the Crete to Danube. During the time of Tetrarchy, the diocese was under the jurisdiction of Caesar Galerius who kept it under his own control during much of his reign as Augustus (305-311). He died and was buried in the city of Felix Romuliana, on the territory of the Diocese of Moesia.
 
The diocese was later split in two, forming the Diocese of Macedonia in the south and the Diocese of Dacia in the north, probably under Constantine I (r. 306–337), although the division is not attested until ca. 370. The two new dioceses were grouped into the new praetorian prefecture of Illyricum in the second half of the 4th century, which essentially covered the same area as the Diocese of Moesia.

Administration
After the administrative reforms of emperor Diocletian, the Diocese of Moesia was composed of provinces:
Achaea
Crete
Dacia Mediterranea
Dacia Ripensis
Dardania
Epirus Nova
Epirus Vetus
Insulae
Macedonia Prima
Macedonia Secunda
Moesia Prima
Praevalitana
Thessalia Prima
Thessalia Secunda

References

Sources

Civil dioceses of the Roman Empire
States and territories established in the 290s
Ancient history of the Balkans
Bulgaria in the Roman era
Serbia in the Roman era
Moesia
Roman Dacia